"Lately I" is a song by American singer Faith Evans. It was written by Diane Warren and Steven "Stevie J" Jordan for her second studio album Keep the Faith (1998), while production was helmed by David Foster, with Stevie J co-producing and Mike Mason providing additional production. The song was released as the album's fourth and final single in November 1999 and reached number 78 on the US Billboard Hot R&B/Hip-Hop Songs chart.

Track listings

Notes
  denotes co-producer
  denotes additional producer

Credits and personnel 
Credits adapted from the liner notes of Keep the Faith.

 Tony Black – mixing
 Felipe Eigueta – recording
 Faith Evans – arranger, vocals
 David Foster – producer

 Stevie J – co-producer, mixing, writer
 Mike Mason – additional producer, instruments
 Diane Warren – writer

Charts

References

1999 singles
Bad Boy Records singles
Faith Evans songs
Song recordings produced by David Foster
Songs written by Diane Warren
1998 songs
Songs written by Stevie J
Contemporary R&B ballads
1990s ballads